Porteath is a hamlet in the parish of St Minver, Cornwall, England.

References

Hamlets in Cornwall